Danny McAllister (born 21 December 1974) is an Australian former professional rugby league footballer who played for Gold Coast and South Sydney in the National Rugby League (NRL).  He also played for the Sheffield Eagles and Gateshead Thunder in England.

Playing career
A forward, McAllister started his professional rugby league career in England, playing for the Sheffield Eagles from 1995 to 1997. 

McAllister debuted in the NRL in 1998 at the Gold Coast Chargers and made 16 first-grade appearance that season, which was the club's last in the competition. 

In 1999, he returned to England to play for Gateshead.

Over the next three years, McAllister competed in the Queensland Cup, for Ipswich and Wynnum-Manly.

Midway through the 2003 NRL season, while still with Ipswich, he was recruited into South Sydney's league side, to become the club's 1000th first-grade player.

References

External links
Danny McAllister at Rugby League project

1974 births
Living people
Australian rugby league players
Rugby league props
Rugby league second-rows
Gold Coast Chargers players
South Sydney Rabbitohs players
Sheffield Eagles players
Gateshead Thunder (1999) players
Ipswich Jets players
Wynnum Manly Seagulls players